Bohemian National Cemetery may refer to:
Bohemian National Cemetery (Baltimore, Maryland)
Bohemian National Cemetery (Chicago, Illinois)